Blaikie is a Scottish surname.

Etymology 
Blaikie derives from "blaik" (adj.), a word in the Scots language meaning black, plus the common Scots diminutive suffix "-ie".

The Dictionar o the Scots Leid ("Dictionary of the Scots Language") says the etymology of "blaik" is: "Blaik, a.  [e.m.E. and ME. blake, ME. blaak(e, OE. blace, blaca, etc., declensional forms of blæc Blak a.] Black.".

Old records in Scotland 
Into the 20th century the Blaikie surname name has been recorded in inextricably confused forms in Scottish parish, census and statutory records, often interchangeably with the spellings "Blackie", "Blakie", "Blaickie", "Blaikkie", "Bleakie", "Blekie", "Bleckie" etc. Nowadays, the spelling of surnames is more permanent and the various spellings are independent.

The oldest surviving and digitally available old parish Kirk birth register (Church of Scotland) entry for the "Blaikie" spelling of the name is dated 29 October 1598 in the parish of Prestonpans (near Edinburgh, Scotland) for Johnne Blaikie, son of Johnne Blaikie and Cristiane Finlaysoun. 

The oldest surviving and digitally available old parish Kirk registers deaths and burials (Church of Scotland) entry for the "Blaikie" spelling of the name is recorded in the Canongate Parish of Edinburgh, Scotland for John Blaikie dated March 1658.

The oldest surviving and digitally available old parish Kirk Banns and marriage register (Church of Scotland) entries for the "Blaikie" spelling of the name are dated 7th February 1604 for Umphray Young and Janet Blaikie in Edinburgh, Scotland; 14th February 1604 for Hew Myller and Jeane Blaikie in South Leith Parish, Leith, Scotland; and two entries from the Parish of Pencaitland, East Lothian for Patrik Blaikie and Nanes Dobie on 1st January 1605 and Andro Mairteine and Cristiane Blaikie on 5th July 1606.

People 
 Alan James Blaikie, (born 1972, Greenock, Inverclyde, Scotland) Scottish retired footballer, best known for playing for Greenock Morton. 
 Professor Andrew Blaikie, Scottish sociologist, Emeritus Professor at the School of Divinity, History, Philosophy & Art History, University of Aberdeen, Aberdeen, Scotland.
 Andrew Blaikie (born 1738 in Faughhill, Roxburghshire, Scotland) Scottish farmer and diarist. Author of "A Scottish Farmer's Ride Through England 100 Years Ago" (posthumously published) in 1906.
 Andrew Blaikie, early 19th century Scottish music collector of ballads and songs (an engraver by trade), in Paisley, Scotland. The Blaikie Manuscript of 17th century Scottish music is named after him.
 Bill Blaikie (1951-2022), former Canadian MP and deputy leader of the New Democratic Party (NDP) in Canada. Bill Blaikie was of Scottish heritage.
 Colin Fraser Blaikie (born 1941), Scotland international rugby union player.
 Daniel Blaikie (born 1984), Canadian MP from the New Democratic Party (NDP), son of Bill Blaikie.
 Duncan James Oke Blaikie (born 1975 in Hamilton, New Zealand), former professional Rugby Union player from New Zealand. Played for Highlanders RFC (Dunedin, New Zealand). 
 F.M.B. Blaikie, Scottish illustrator. Illustrated popular books in the early 20th century (1904 - 1914).
 Francis Currie Blaikie (1771-1857), born Holydean, Roxburghshire, Scotland. Scottish agriculturist and land agent who wrote books about agriculture and made a career in England where he worked for Lord Chesterfield and the Earl of Leicester.
 George Neil McLennan Blaikie (1915–1995), Australian author and journalist.
 Jane Currie Blaikie Hoge, welfare worker, fund raiser, and wartime nurse.
 Captain James Blaikie (1861-1930) Born Aberdeen, Scotland. Scottish Captain in the United Kingdom Royal Navy. Naval officer during World War I. Captain of the SS Caledonia naval ship sunk by a German U-boat in the Mediterranean in 1916. Taken as a prisoner of war by the Germans.
 James (Jim) Blaikie (born 1933 in North Leith Parish, Scotland) Scottish author and poet. Author of "A Laddie Looks at Leith" and "A Laddie Looks at Leith Again".
 James Blaikie (born circa 1725, Leith, Scotland) cabinet maker and carpenter to Sir James Clerk of Penicuik, working on the building of Penicuik House, Midlothian, Scotland between 1761 and 1770 and to Duke of Buccleuch during the building of Dalkeith Palace, Midlothian, Scotland.
 James Armstrong Blaikie, (born in Roxburghshire, Scotland, d. 1940, Gore, Southland, New Zealand). Scottish-New Zealand surveyor and foundation member of the New Zealand Institute of Surveyors. Blaikies Hill and Blaikies Creek in Rakiura (or Stewart Island), New Zealand are named after him.
 James Ogilvie Blaikie of Craigiebuckler (1786-1836), Lord Provost of Aberdeen (1833-1836).
 John Blaikie (born 1973) former professional Rugby Union player from New Zealand. Played for Highlanders RFC (Dunedin, New Zealand) and FC Grenoble, France.
 John Arthur Blaikie (born 1849, Poplar, London, England), English poet and journalist. John Arthur's Blaikie's father's family were Scottish.
 John MacKay Blaikie (born 1837) Canadian shipbuilder from Great Village, Nova Scotia, Canada.
 Margaret Catherine Blaikie (1823 -1915), Scottish temperance reformer
 Dr. Patrick Blaikie M.D. R.N. (1791-1830), (born Aberdeen, Scotland) Scottish medical Officer in the United Kingdom's Royal Navy. Served on HMS Caledonia in 1812 and HMS Undaunted in 1814. Later physician to the Lunatic Asylum in Aberdeen, Scotland. He was serving in HMS Undaunted when it carried Napoleon from France to Elba in 1814.
 Peter Macfarlane Blaikie (born 1937), Canadian lawyer and politician.
 Piers MacLeod Blaikie (born 1942 in Helensburgh, Scotland), Scottish geographer and scholar of international development and natural resources. Professor Emeritus at the University of East Anglia, Norwich (UEA), England.
 Rebecca Blaikie (born 1978), Canadian MP and former president of the New Democratic Party (NDP), daughter of Bill Blaikie.
 Robert Blair Blaikie (1906-1992), American businessman and Democrat politician in Manhattan, New York, and founder of insurance and surety firm Blaikie Group, in Manhattan, New York. His father Robert, a restaurateur, hailed from Edinburgh, Scotland and his mother, the former Mary Loughlin, from Ireland.
 Robert William Chisholm Blaikie (1868 - 1952), Scottish poet born in Edinburgh and raised in Bolshan, Angus, Scotland. Author of "Lea-Rig Fancies: The Rhymes of a Farm Servant" (Brechin, 1900). 
 Sir Thomas Blaikie of Kingseat (1802-1861), Lord Provost of Aberdeen (1839-1847 and 1853-1856).
 Thomas Blaikie (gardener) (1758-1838), Scottish gardener who worked in Paris, France. Author of "Diary of a Scotch Gardener at the French Court at the End of the Eighteenth Century".
 Walter Biggar Blaikie (1847-1928), Scottish civil engineer, printer, historian and astronomer.
 William Garden Blaikie (1820-1899), Scottish writer, biographer, and activist in the temperance movement.

Places 

 Blaikies Creek, Southland, Rakiura (or Stewart Island), New Zealand.
 Blaikie Heugh (or Blaikie's Heugh or Bleakie Heugh), Papple, East Lothian, Scotland (site of the Balfour Monument).
 Blaikie Heugh, at Hurker's Haven, near Partanhall, Eyemouth, Berwickshire, Scotland.
 Blaikie's Hill, Galashiels, Scotland.
 Blaikie's Hill, Rakiura (or Stewart Island), New Zealand.
 Blaikies Mews, Dundee, Scotland.
 Blaikie Mill, on the Aldbar estate, Aberlemno Parish, near Brechin, Angus, Scotland (listed 19th century woolen, spinning, corn and saw mill).
 Blaikie Pit, at Hurker's Haven, near Partanhall, Eyemouth, Berwickshire, Scotland.
 Blaikie Place, Kingseat, by Newmachar, Aberdeenshire, Scotland.
 Blaikie's Quay, Aberdeen, Scotland.
 Blaikie Road, Jamisontown, Sydney, Australia.
 Blaikie Village, a croft and some dwelling houses near Ardlair Wood, near Tullynessle, by Alford, Aberdeenshire, Scotland.

Other 
Blaikie may also refer to:
Aberdeen Railway Co v Blaikie Brothers, UK company law case.
Agnes Blaikie (barque), merchant ship chartered by the British government during the Crimean War.
Attorney General of Quebec v. Blaikie (No. 1), Supreme Court of Canada decision on language rights.
Beaton Blaikie, law firm, Amherst, Nova Scotia, Canada.
Blaikie & Alexander, 19th century Canadian accountants, brokers and estate agents based in Toronto, Canada.
Blaikie Brothers, 19th century iron foundry, in Aberdeen, Scotland.
Blaikie Manuscripts 1683 and 1692. These are music books from the 17th century in Glasgow. These two books were both owned by the Paisley music collector and engraver Andrew Blaikie in 1820s. The 1683 Blaikie Manuscript is now lost but was a Glasgow manuscript, once owned by Lady Katherine Boyd, daughter of William, first earl of Kilmarnock. Title lists were published e.g. by William Dauney, Ancient Scottish Melodies, 1838. A selection of the tunes were copied from the 1692 ms, in tablature by A.J. Wighton in the early 19th century; his hand copy is in Dundee Central Library.
Francis Blaikie & Sons, 19th century firm of wine merchants, salvage agents, and insurance brokers based in Queen Street, Glasgow, Scotland.
Heenan Blaikie, defunct Canadian law firm (1973 - 2014).
James Blaikie & Sons, 19th century iron foundry and iron bridge manufacturers, in Edinburgh, Scotland.
John M. Blaikie (barque), ship built in 1885 at Londonderry,  Nova Scotia, Canada by John MacKay Blaikie and owned by McLellan & Blaikie. Wrecked 4 May 1891.
McLellan & Blaikie, a 19th and early 20th century ship building firm in Londonderry, Nova Scotia, Canada.

Notable people called Blaikie connected to the Jacobite Rising of 1715 and the Lord Provosts of Aberdeen 
Scottish writer Alexander MacDonald Munro reports that some men by the name of Blaikie, belonging originally to the Borders, fought in the Jacobite army in the failed Jacobite Rising of 1715. It is said that during the '15 Rising the father of a David Blaikie was called out of the ranks of the Jacobite army and shown to the so called "Old Pretender", James Francis Edward Stuart, as one of the finest Jacobite soldiers or "Highlanders", being a very big man. Following the failed '15 Rising, it is said that this Jacobite soldier called Blaikie was given a land grant to farm near Dunkeld, Perthshire by Jacobite Scottish nobleman James Drummond, 2nd Duke of Perth. Around 1780, his son or grandson, John Blaikie, left Dunkeld, Perthshire and moved to Aberdeen where he had children, including two sons who would both later go on to be the Lord Provosts of Aberdeen, James and Sir Thomas.

Battle of Flodden (1513) 
It is said that a James Blaikie bore a standard for the Scottish army at the Battle of Flodden in 1513 between Scotland and England, and was therefore among the men referenced in the Scottish ballad “Flowers of the Forest” who fell at the Battle of Flodden.

See also 
 Blackie (disambiguation)

References